Sauerland is a German surname. Notable people with the surname include:

David Sauerland (born 1997), German footballer 
Jörg Sauerland (born 1976), German footballer
Wilfried Sauerland (born 1940), German boxing promoter and manager

German-language surnames